A recreational skipper's ticket is the Western Australian equivalent of a boat driver's licence; however, it is considered a certificate of competency rather than a licence. It has been required to be held by the skipper of all recreational boats with an engine greater than 4.5 kW (6HP) since April 2008.

References 

Water transport in Australia